Disilitsa Point (‘Nos Disilitsa’ \'nos di-'si-li-tsa\) is the rocky point on the south side of the entrance to Bolbabria Cove and the north side of the entrance to Vapa Cove on the west coast of Liège Island in the Palmer Archipelago, Antarctica.

The point is named after Disilitsa Peak in Pirin Mountain, Bulgaria.

Location
British mapping in 1980.

Maps
 British Antarctic Territory.  Scale 1:200000 topographic map.  DOS 610 Series, Sheet W 64 62.  Directorate of Overseas Surveys, UK, 1980.
 Antarctic Digital Database (ADD). Scale 1:250000 topographic map of Antarctica. Scientific Committee on Antarctic Research (SCAR). Since 1993, regularly upgraded and updated.

References
 Bulgarian Antarctic Gazetteer. Antarctic Place-names Commission. (details in Bulgarian, basic data in English)
 Disilitsa Point. SCAR Composite Antarctic Gazetteer.

External links
 Disilitsa Point. Copernix satellite image

Headlands of the Palmer Archipelago
Bulgaria and the Antarctic
Liège Island